The Kilpatrick and Beatty text-messaging scandal was a political sex scandal in the United States emerging from a whistleblower lawsuit involving former Detroit Police chief Gary Brown, Detroit mayor Kwame Kilpatrick and his former chief of staff and paramour Christine Beatty.

Historical background
The controversy started from rumors of a wild party, alleged to have occurred on Labor Day weekend of 2002, involving strippers at the official residence of the mayor—the city-owned Manoogian Mansion. It was alleged by former members of the mayor's Executive Protection Unit that the mayor's wife, Carlita Kilpatrick, came home unexpectedly and upon discovering Kwame with the strippers began to attack one of the women. Allegedly, injuries from Carlita's assault sent the woman to the hospital.

A stripper, Tamara Greene, was murdered on April 30, 2003; she was alleged to possibly be at the alleged Manoogian Mansion party.
The case has never been solved. Later, in 2004, Detroit Police lieutenant Gary Brown sued Kilpatrick and the City of Detroit, asserting that he was transferred out of his homicide unit to prevent him from investigating the Tamara Greene murder.

Allegations began to surface after Officer Harold C. Nelthrope contacted the internal affairs unit of the Detroit Police in April 2003 to have them investigate abuses by the mayor's Executive Protection Unit (EPU). On May 9, 2003, Kilpatrick fired Gary Brown.

On May 13, 2003, Gary Brown released a memo containing allegations of a wild party held at the Manoogian Mansion in 2002. The memo also alleged Kilpatrick's bodyguards of fraud and misconduct.

On May 15, 2003, Mayor Kilpatrick denied all allegations and rumors of any misconduct by him or his security team. A June, 2004 investigation by Michigan Attorney General Mike Cox and the Michigan State Police found no evidence that the party actually happened.

Whistleblower trial

Brown and Nelthorpe filed a whistleblower lawsuit against Kilpatrick and the City of Detroit. Former Detroit chief of staff Christine Beatty's text messages were subpoenaed. The trial was held from August 20 to September 11, 2007. Kilpatrick and Beatty testified under oath that they did not have any romantic or sexual relationship, and they did not fire Brown or Nelthorpe in retribution for their investigations.

During the trial, Gary Brown requested the text messages from Kilpatrick and Beatty's phones, but was told that the messages were misplaced. However, Brown and Nelthorpe won their case, and were awarded $6.5 million plus interest in a settlement with the City of Detroit.

Later, Brown's attorney, Michael Stefani, received the "lost" text messages, and used them to obtain attorney fees. When City of Detroit attorneys realized the content of the text messages in November 2007, a new settlement agreement and general release was drafted. Brown's team was to turn over all original records and copies of text messages between Kilpatrick and Beatty that were obtained after the completion of the trial, and heavy sanctions were specified for breach of confidentiality in the settlement. The settlement amount was upped to $8.4 million. On December 5, 2007, Kilpatrick, Beatty, and all other parties signed the settlement agreement. Kilpatrick and Beatty signed as individuals, not officials of the city. Gary Brown's lawyer, Michael Stefani, signed a confidentiality agreement.

Discovery and exposure of the text messages

On October 19, 2007, the Detroit Free Press requested all documents related to the settlement be released to the public under the Freedom of Information Act. Initially, the City of Detroit Counsel Corporation rejected the Detroit Free Press Freedom of Information Act Request on the grounds that the settlement had not been reached.

In January 2008, the Detroit Free Press examined and revealed the existence of more than 14,000 text messages exchanged between mayor Kwame Kilpatrick and his then-chief of staff Christine Beatty on their city-issued SkyTel pagers between September and October 2002 and April and May 2003. The dates encompass the time periods of an alleged party at the mayoral Manoogian Mansion and the ouster of Gary Brown, respectively. The messages detailed a sexual relationship between Kilpatrick and Beatty. The text messages also contradicted testimony that Kilpatrick and Beatty gave at a trial in 2007 in regard to whether they had an affair and had fired Brown for investigating the mayor's behavior. The text messages describe Kilpatrick and Beatty's use of city funds to arrange romantic getaways, their fears of being caught by the mayor's police protection unit, and evidence the pair conspired to fire Detroit Police chief Gary Brown.

In an August 2007 trial, Kilpatrick and Beatty both under oath denied that they had a sexual relationship or that they fired Brown. The text messages contradict their sworn testimony with such messages as:Beatty: "And, did you miss me, sexually?"Kilpatrick: "Hell yeah! You couldn't tell. I want some more."andBeatty: "I'm sorry that we are going through this mess because of a decision that we made to fire Gary Brown. I will make sure that the next decision is much more thought out. Not regretting what was done at all. But thinking about how we can do things smarter."Kilpatrick: "It had to happen though. I'm all the way with that!"

Repercussions

Beatty resigned in February 2008 amid political leaders and citizens calling for Kilpatrick to resign as well. She also left Wayne State Law School, where she was studying for a juris doctor degree.

An investigation led to the filing of charges against Kilpatrick and Beatty on March 24, 2008.

On September 4, 2008, Kilpatrick pleaded guilty to obstruction of justice and no contest to assault on a police officer. As part of his plea deal, he agreed to step down as mayor, pay $1 million in restitution to the city, and serve 120 days of jail time. He also lost his law license and state pension, and will serve 5 years' probation after his jail term is over.

Citations

State and local political sex scandals in the United States
Political scandals in Michigan
Text messaging
Detroit Free Press
Sexting